Anadasmus venosella is a moth in the family Depressariidae. It was described by Francis Walker in 1864. It is found in Amazonas in Brazil and in Bolivia.

References

Moths described in 1864
Anadasmus
Moths of South America